Mark Andrew Geoffrey Kent  (born Spilsby 14 January 1966) is a British businessman and former diplomat who served as UK ambassador to Argentina from 2016 to 2021.

Kent was educated at Queen Elizabeth's Grammar School, Horncastle before he read Law at Lincoln College, Oxford. He joined Her Majesty's Diplomatic Service in 1987. He  served in Brasilia, Brussels, Mexico City and Casteau before being appointed Ambassador to Vietnam in 2007. From 2012 to 2016 he was Ambassador to Thailand.

Kent was appointed Companion of the Order of St Michael and St George (CMG) in the 2020 Birthday Honours for services to British foreign policy.

In 2021 Kent was appointed the ninth Chief Executive of the Scotch Whisky Association.

References

People from Spilsby
1966 births
Living people
People educated at Queen Elizabeth's Grammar School, Horncastle
Alumni of Lincoln College, Oxford
Ambassadors of the United Kingdom to Vietnam
Ambassadors of the United Kingdom to Thailand
Ambassadors of the United Kingdom to Argentina
Companions of the Order of St Michael and St George